The Waverton Good Read Award was founded in 2003 by villagers in Waverton, Chester, England, and is based on Le Prix de la Cadière d'Azur, a literary prize awarded by a Provençal village.  Adult debut novels written by UK residents and published in the previous twelve months are eligible for consideration and are read by villagers. "The aim was not only to stimulate reading in the village but to provide encouragement to British writers". Two of the main founders were Gwen Goodhew (b 21 October 1942) an educational specialist who established Wirral Able Child Centre and has written and edited books on teaching the gifted child, and Wendy Smedley. It is the first British award to be judged by normal readers rather than literary figures.

Waverton Good Read Children's Award was first presented in 2011, for children's literature.

Due to the COVID pandemic, the 2019/20 shortlist and winner were announced on the same day, and there was no Children's award.

Winners and shortlists

{|class="wikitable"
|-
!Year
!Winner
!Shortlisted
|- style="vertical-align:top;"
! |2003/4
| The Curious Incident of the Dog in the Night-Time, by Mark Haddon
|
Astonishing Splashes of Colour, by Clare Morrall
Brick Lane, by Monica Ali
Dissolution, by C. J. Sansom
Spit Against the Wind, by Anna Smith
|- style="vertical-align:top;"
! |2004/5
|Boy A, by Jonathan Trigell
|
At Risk, by Stella Rimington
 Betrayal in Naples, by Neil Griffiths
Perception of Death, by Louise Anderson
The Two Pound Tram, by William Newton
|- style="vertical-align:top;"
! |2005/6
|A Short History of Tractors in Ukrainian, by Marina Lewycka
|
The Family Tree, by Carole Cadwalladr
 Emotional Geology, by Linda Gillard
The Water Horse, by Julia Gregson
This Thing of Darkness, by Harry Thompson
|- style="vertical-align:top;"
! |2006/7
|The Killing Jar, by Nicola Monaghan
|
Gang of Four, by Liz Byrski
Where They Were Missed, by Lucy Caldwell
The Observations, by Jane Harris
Mr. Clarinet, by Nick Stone
|- style="vertical-align:top;"
! |2007/8
|Salmon Fishing in the Yemen, by Paul Torday
|
Gifted, by Nikita Lalwani
In the Woods by Tana French
Mosquito by Roma Tearne
The Dead of Summer by Camilla Way
The Solitude of Thomas Cave by Georgina Harding
|- style="vertical-align:top;"
! |2008/9
| Child 44 by Tom Rob Smith  
|
A Girl Made of Dust, by Natalie Abi-Ezi
The Outcast by Sadie Jones
Spider by Michael Morley

|- style="vertical-align:top;"
! |2009/10
| The Ghosts of Eden by Andrew Sharp  
|
Girl in a Blue Dress, by Gaynor Arnold
The Coroner by M R Hall
The Street Philosopher by Matthew Pamplin
The Rescue Man by Anthony Quinn
|- style="vertical-align:top;"
! |2010/11
| Major Pettigrew's Last Stand by Helen Simonson  
|
Grace Williams Says it Loud by Emma Henderson
The Breaking of Eggs by Jim Powell
The Return of Captain John Emmett by Elizabeth Speller
Luke and Jon by Robert Williams
|- style="vertical-align:top;"
! |2011/12
| Tiny Sunbirds Far Away by Christie Watson  
|
A Cupboard Full of Coats by Yvvette Edwards
Into the Darkest Corner by Elizabeth Haynes
22 Britannia Road by Amanda Hodgkinson
Sister by Rosamund Lupton
Snowdrops by A D Miller
|- style="vertical-align:top;"
! |2012/13
| The Unlikely Pilgrimage of Harold Fry by Rachel Joyce  
|
Tell the Wolves I'm Home by Carol Rifka Brunt
Rhumba by Elaine Proctor
The Bellwether Revivals by Benjamin Wood
The House on Paradise Street by Sofka Zinovieff
|- style="vertical-align:top;"
! |2013/14
| The Universe Versus Alex Woods by Gavin Extence
|
Just What Kind of Mother Are You? by Paula Daly  
The Shock of the Fall by Nathan Filer
What the River Washed Away by Muriel M Macleod
The Rosie Project by Graeme Simsion
|- style="vertical-align:top;"
! |2014/15
| If I Should Die by Matthew Frank
|
A Song for Issy Bradley by Carys Bray
Wake by Anna Hope
Daughter by Jane Shemilt	
After Before by Jemma Wayne
|- style="vertical-align:top;"
! |2015/16
|The Death's Head Chess Club by John Donoghue
|
Letters to the Lost by Iona Grey
I Let You Go by Clare Mackintosh
Burnt Paper Sky by Gilly Macmillan
The Improbability of Love by Hannah Rothschild
|- style="vertical-align:top;"
! |2016/17
|Anatomy of a Soldier by Harry Parker
|
Crisis by Frank Gardner
The Words in My Hand by Guinevere Glasfurd
Belonging by Umi Sinha
The People We Were Before by Annabelle Thorpe
|- style="vertical-align:top;"
! |2017/18
|Eleanor Oliphant is Completely Fine by Gail Honeyman
|
Montpelier Parade by Karl Geary
Not Thomas by Sara Gethin
The Pinocchio Brief by Abi Silver
A Boy Made of Blocks by Keith Stuart
|- style="vertical-align:top;"
! |2018/19
|White Chrysanthemum by Mary Lynn Bracht
|
White Chrysanthemum by Mary Lynn Bracht
Call of the Curlew by Elizabeth Brooks
Bitter by Francesca JakobiKiller Intent by Tony KentThe Sealwoman's Gift by Sally Magnusson
|- style="vertical-align:top;"
! |2019/20
|Island Song by Madeleine Bunting
|Sunfall by Jim Al-KhaliliNightingale Point by Luan GoldiePieces of Me by Natalie HartShe Lies in Wait by Gytha Lodge
|}

Waverton Good Read Children's Award
In 2011, the inaugural Waverton Good Read Children's Award was presented.

 Winners
 2011 Stephanie Burgis, A Most Improper Magick 2012 Caroline Green, Dark Ride 2013 L A Jones, The Nightmare Factory 2014 Erika McGann, The Demon Notebook 2015 Simon Mayle, Shoutykid - How Harry Riddles Made a Mega-amazing Zombie Movie 2016 Kerr Thomson, The Sound of Whales 2017/18 Katie Smith, The Pumpkin Project 2018/19 Andrew Clover, Rory Branagan, Detective''

External links
Waverton Good Read website
Saint, T. "'I'm not even the fifth best novelist in Waverton'", Telegraph (30 June 2004)
Keeper of the Snails: The Waverton Good Read Award (interview with one of the organisers)

British fiction awards
Awards established in 2003
2003 establishments in England
First book awards